Tășnad (Hungarian: Tasnád,; German: Trestenburg) is a town in Satu Mare County, Crișana, Romania. It administers five villages: Blaja (Tasnádbalázsháza), Cig (Csög), Rațiu (Ráctanya), Sărăuad (Tasnádszarvad) and Valea Morii (Tasnádmalomszeg).

At about 2 km from the center lies Tășnad geothermal Spa, known in Romania and abroad for its thermal waters.

Demographics

According to the last census from 2011 there were 8,411  people living within the city.

Of this population, 51.1% are ethnic Romanians, while 36.2% are ethnic Hungarians, 11.4% ethnic Romani and 1,1% others.

As of 2022, the city contains the Reformed Church, a Baptist Church, the Orthodox cathedral, a Roman Catholic church and a Greek Catholic church.

Dr. Abraham Fuchs wrote a comprehensive historical book about Tășnad as it was up to World War II. The book is in Hebrew and describes the vibrant Jewish life in this small town up until its destruction in 1944.

History
At the archaeological site of Tășnad-Sere in the Spa-area, finds from the Neolithic Körös, Pișcolt and Baden cultures have been made as well as remains from the late Iron Age and the migration period (Chernyakhov culture). Since 2012, Ulrike Sommer from the Institute of archaeology London conducts excavations of the Körös site together with the Satu Mare Museum. Until 1876, Tășnad was part of Közép-Szolnok County when it was incorporated in the newly formed Szilágy County of the Kingdom of Hungary. In 1920, after the Treaty of Trianon it became part of the Kingdom of Romania.

Education

Schoools
Industrial School Group in Tășnad

References

 
Towns in Romania
Spa towns in Romania
Populated places in Satu Mare County
Localities in Crișana